Boston Renegades was an American women’s soccer team, founded in 2003. The team was a member of the United Soccer Leagues USL W-League, the second tier of women’s soccer in the United States and Canada. The team plays in the Northeast Division of the Eastern Conference. The team folded after the 2009 season.

The team played its home games in the stadium on the campus of Wayland High School in the city of Wayland, Massachusetts, 15 miles west of downtown Boston. The team's colors are red and white.

The team is a sister organization of the former men's Cape Cod Crusaders team, which played in the USL Premier Development League until 2009.

Players

Squad 2009

Club Officials
 Peter Bradley, Technical Director
 Jon Coles, Director of Operations
 Andrew Moir, Director of Media
 Graham Munro, Director of Corporate Sales

Notable former players

  Michelle Barr
  Shannon Boxx
  Niki Cross
  Ásthildur Helgadóttir
  Angela Hucles
  Laura Kalmari
  Allison Martino
  Ciara McCormack
  Mary Therese McDonnell
  Ashley Phillips
  Ashlee Pistorius
  Becky Sauerbrunn
  Kylla Sjoman
  Lisa Stoia
  Jodie Taylor
  Denise Thomas
  Sanna Valkonen

Year-by-year

Honors
 USL W-League New England Division Champions 2004
 USL W-League Northern Division Champions 2003

Coaches
  Darren Gallagher 2008–present

Stadia
 Bowditch Stadium, Framingham, Massachusetts 2008-date
 Stadium at Whitman-Hanson High School, Whitman, Massachusetts 2008 (1 game)

References

External links
Boston Renegades/Mass Premier Soccer

   

Women's soccer clubs in the United States
Soccer clubs in Massachusetts
Sports in Framingham, Massachusetts
USL W-League (1995–2015) teams
2003 establishments in Massachusetts
2009 disestablishments in Massachusetts
Wayland, Massachusetts
Association football clubs established in 2003
Association football clubs disestablished in 2009